Manufacturers of motorcycle suspension systems, parts, and accessories.

 Ceriani, Italy
 Fox Racing Shox, US
 KYB Corporation, Japan
 Marzocchi Moto, Italy
 Öhlins Racing AB, Sweden
 Showa Corporation, Japan
WP Suspension, Austria(Netherlands)
ZF Sachs, Germany
Paioli, Italy

Motorcycle parts manufacturers
motorcycle
Automotive motorsports and performance companies
motorcycle